The National Basketball League Good Hands honour was awarded annually to a player in the National Basketball League (NBL) between 1990 and 1999. The award was determined by adding assists and steals and subtracting the player's turnover count. After 1999, the award was discontinued.

Winners

References

Good Hands Award
Awards established in 1990
Awards disestablished in 1999